Marc Cécillon (born 30 July 1959 in Bourgoin-Jallieu, Isère) is a former French rugby union player and convicted murderer, who captained the national side on five occasions. He represented France from 1988 to 1995, with 46 test caps, including playing in the 1991 and 1995 World Cups. Cécillon, who played both number 8 and flanker, was known as the Quiet Man of French rugby.

In August 2004, Cécillon was arrested by French police for murdering his wife, whom he shot in front of 60 people at a party in Saint Savin (near to Bourgoin-Jallieu). A blood test showed that Cécillon was drunk. On 10 November 2006, Cécillon was found guilty of murdering his wife and sentenced to 20 years in prison, five more years than the prosecution had sought. The sentence was reduced to 14 years on appeal.
The French media heavily followed the case.

He was freed on parole on 7 July 2011.

In September 2018 Cècillion was  charged with "driving under the influence of alcohol, without a license and at excessive speed, violence against a person in a state of drunkenness and theft". He was sentenced to 12 months in prison, with six suspended, and fined 350 euros. The incident occurred after he was working at a vineyard and was drinking at a post-harvest evening event. Cecillon reportedly assaulted the vineyard's owner and some other workers who tried to intervene before getting in a vehicle and hitting a parked truck. At his trial Cecillon acknowledged that he was still struggling with alcohol.

Peter FitzSimons remains a strong supporter.

References

1959 births
Living people
People from Bourgoin-Jallieu
French rugby union players
People convicted of murder by France
French people convicted of murder
France international rugby union players
Sportspeople from Isère
Sportspeople convicted of murder
Rugby union number eights
CS Bourgoin-Jallieu players